Book-and-record sets are a form of entertainment for children, consisting of a picture storybook (often in comic book format, with drawings or photos) and an accompanying recording (originally in the form of a vinyl record; later in cassette tape and compact disc formats) to be played while following along with the book. The record and book complement one another, with the record usually a radio theater-style version of the story or a soundtrack recording, and the book providing visuals and text to the story. Often a tone or other kind of cue in the recording will prompt the reader to turn pages.

Book-and-record sets are popular as teaching tools and aids to reading, and as a simple form of multimedia entertainment. Cartoon characters are common subjects (or stars) of the stories, as are comic book superheroes and other media franchises, characters and personalities. Occasionally popular children's or family movies are adapted for book and record; the stories may either be re-presented by a new cast of performers, members of the movie cast, or the audio taken directly from the movie, with narration added.

Disneyland Records and related companies produced several such works, as did Peter Pan Records (and its offshoot Power Records) and others, from the dawn of long-playing records and the 45rpm single until the digital age. In the late 1940s and early 1950s, Capitol Records produced many book-and-record sets for children, ranging from everything from Bozo the Clown to the classical music fantasy Sparky's Magic Piano. A "picture storybook" of the 1982 movie E.T. the Extra-Terrestrial narrated by Michael Jackson became a highly prized collectible, after it went out of print. Newer sets may still be found among recordings for children.

Books by type
Children's literature
Educational materials
Album types
Storytelling